Reboot Camp is an American satirical comedy film written and directed by Ivo Raza. It premiered at the 2020 Austin Film Festival where it won the Comedy Vanguard Audience Award for best comedy film. It also won best narrative feature award at the 2020 Maui Film Festival and best comedy at the 2021 Garden State Film Festival and best comedy at CINEQUEST 2021. The film features an ensemble cast including David Lipper, Lindsey Shaw, Keli Price, Ja Rule, Chaz Bono, David Koechner, Eric Roberts, Maya Stojan, Shar Jackson and Ed Begley Jr.

Plot 
The mockumentary follows brothers and filmmakers Danny (Price) and Seymour (Lipper) Gordon who create Reboot Camp, a fake self-help group, and its leader Gordon to expose the exploitive practices of fake gurus and how easy it is to con people into believing just about anything. To their surprise, their absurd Reboot Camp becomes a big success with a devoted following and turns into an actual cult. As the camp grows with more members and celebrities, the brothers run out of funds and the producer (McClintock) pushes them to hire his niece Claire (Stojan). Reluctant at first, she eventually sees a golden opportunity to make money and causes a rift between the brothers.

Cast

Production

Development and production 
Reboot Camp was written and directed by independent filmmaker Ivo Raza. It was produced by David Lipper and Tina Sutakanat, executive producers Bernard Azer, Alan Braverman and Tim Alek. Additional producers include James Johnston, David Roberson, and Keli Price.

Filming 
The film was shot at various locations around Los Angeles, including Woodland Hills, Mulholland Drive, Santa Clarita, Venice Beach and Studio City. The cinematographer was Derrick Cohan.

References

External links 

 
Review at Chicago Indie Critics
Review at Young Hollywood
Review at Comicon
Interview in Forbes 

2020 films
2020 comedy films
American mockumentary films
American comedy films
American satirical films
Films shot in Los Angeles
Films set in Los Angeles
Films about cults
Films about actors
Films about filmmaking
Films about films
Films about film directors and producers
Self-reflexive films
Films about brothers
2020s English-language films
2020s American films